Zophorame is a genus of Australian brushed trapdoor spiders first described by Robert Raven in 1990.

Species
 it contains four species:
Zophorame covacevichae Raven, 1994 – Australia (Queensland)
Zophorame gallonae Raven, 1990 – Australia (Queensland)
Zophorame hirsti Raven, 1994 – Australia (Queensland)
Zophorame simoni Raven, 1990 (type) – Australia (Queensland)

References

Barychelidae
Mygalomorphae genera
Spiders of Australia